The 2019–20 season was Willem II's 124th season in existence and the club's 6th consecutive season in the top flight of Dutch football. It covers a period from 1 July 2019 to 30 June 2020. They participated in the Eredivisie and the KNVB Cup.

Players

Current squad

Out on loan

Transfers

In

Out

Pre-season and friendlies

Competitions

Overview

Eredivisie

League table

Results summary

Results by round

Matches
The Eredivisie schedule was announced on 14 June 2019. The 2019–20 season was abandoned on 24 April 2020, due to the coronavirus pandemic in the Netherlands.

KNVB Cup

References

External links

Willem II (football club) seasons
Willem II